Linus Van Pelt is a fictional character in Charles M. Schulz’s comic strip Peanuts. He is the best friend of Charlie Brown, the younger brother of Lucy Van Pelt, and the older brother of Rerun Van Pelt. He first appeared on September 19, 1952, but he was not mentioned by name until three days later. He was first referred to two months earlier, on July 14. Linus spoke his first words in 1954, the same year he was first shown with his security blanket.

When he was a costumed character in Mall of America during the Camp Snoopy years, he usually wore a blue baseball cap. It was removed from his head when he was redesigned.

The character's creator, Charles M. Schulz, has said of the character, "Linus, my serious side, is the house intellectual, bright, well-informed which, I suppose may contribute to his feelings of insecurity."

Lee Mendelson, producer of the majority of the "Peanuts" television specials, has said that Linus is his favorite character: "He made sucking your thumb and holding a security blanket OK. I think he's one of the most original fictional characters of all time-blending childish behavior with great wisdom."

Personality 
Though young, Linus is very intelligent and very wise and acted as the strip's philosopher and theologian, often quoting the Gospels. Juvenile aspects of his character are also displayed; for example, Linus is almost always depicted holding his blue security blanket, for which he is often mocked by other characters, and he often sucks his thumb. Linus is the only member of his group who believed in the Great Pumpkin, an alternative Santa Claus–like figure who, according to Linus, appears every Halloween, arising from the most "sincere" pumpkin patch and bearing gifts. He occasionally temporarily convinced other characters that the Great Pumpkin is real, only to stubbornly maintain his faith when they can lose theirs. 

On one occasion in You're Not Elected, Charlie Brown, Linus had a commanding lead in the polls for school president, which lasted until he brought up the subject of the Great Pumpkin, at which point he was nearly laughed out of the election. He ended up winning anyway by one vote, cast by his opponent, who decided that Linus would make a better school president. A similar occurrence was featured in a strip with the same storyline where Charlie Brown asked him why he had to bring up the Great Pumpkin and Linus gave his reasons. After Linus said that Charlie Brown is looking at him as if he was crazy, Charlie Brown responded, "I'm looking at you like I could've been vice president!" due to the fact that unlike in the television special, Linus lost the election in the strip.

In the strip from June 9, 1986, Linus claims that his birthday is in October. Lucy gives him a chair for his birthday in the November 22, 1964, Sunday strip. Like his sister, he loves sinking into his Sacco chair.

Security blanket  
Linus almost always carries his blue security blanket, which debuted in the June 1, 1954, strip. He held it over his shoulder while sucking his thumb. Ridicule of the habit is not a major concern for him. His friend, Roy, warned him at summer camp that he would have to be viciously teased for it, and in response, Linus used his blanket like a whip and sheared off a tree branch with intimidating power, saying, "They never tease me more than once." The blanket, as it turned out, is an autonomous (albeit nonverbal) entity. In a 1965 strip, it engaged in a campaign of clandestine attacks on Lucy, even routing her from the house, due to her constant, although unsuccessful efforts to get rid of it by throwing it in the trash burner. In the special "A Boy Named Charlie Brown", it performed a complex dance routine with Linus upon being reunited with its owner. Linus had lost the blanket, causing him depression, panic attacks, sweating and other withdrawal symptoms.

In the earlier strips, Linus's relationship to his blanket was one of intense emotional attachment to the point of manifesting physical symptoms if he was deprived of it even for a short while. He suffered weakness and dizziness, for example, when Lucy took it from him only long enough to have it laundered, spontaneously recovering when it was restored to him. In "A Boy Named Charlie Brown", Linus manifested similar symptoms when he gave his blanket to Charlie Brown. On another occasion, Lucy snatched his blanket away and buried it in an effort to break Linus of his habit. Linus dug around the neighborhood for days trying to find it until Snoopy finally found the blanket and dug it up.

Possession of the blanket is often sought by Snoopy, who has used many tricks and subterfuges to relieve Linus of it, even at one point having the blanket delivered to his doghouse. Snoopy commonly ran up, quickly grabbed the blanket in his mouth, and dragged Linus along with it, then swung him and the blanket around before letting go and sending them both soaring off. Once, Linus was so angry at Snoopy for snatching his blanket again and again that he retaliated by threatening Snoopy's supper dish. Upon hearing that Linus had possession of his most prized possession, Snoopy gave Linus the blanket back fairly quickly, thinking, "I never dreamed he would fight so dirty!" When Lucy buried the blanket, Snoopy took the time to dig for it himself, which meant that he saw Linus digging and looking for his pale blue security blanket, and when he found it, Linus thanked him, upon which Snoopy thought, "Every now and then I feel that my existence is justified!" Linus always won and got the blanket back.

In one strip, Lucy confiscated Linus's blanket, locking it in a closet for two weeks as part of a bet. Linus thought that he could go without the blanket for two weeks and laughed off Lucy and Charlie Brown's differing opinion. After one week Linus began suffering and freezing without it because he tried to use Snoopy's floppy ears, but Lucy noticed and told him "no substitutes!" After eight days, Linus screamed and cried for the blanket. Finally it appeared that Linus has lost his mind: Charlie Brown persuaded Lucy to give Linus his blanket back when they saw Linus lying on the closet door scratching at it in a vain attempt to open it.

Furthermore, there are many stories where Lucy and Linus's grandmother attempted to force him to give up the blanket, only to eventually concede in the face of his steadfast resistance. Two attempts were when the grandmother in question gave up smoking, and when she offered that if he gave up the blanket she would donate ten dollars to his favorite charity. The deal was not made because Linus did not consider it a fair proposition. In another strip, Lucy warned him that she has arrived. Linus reluctantly handed her the blanket and then went into his room and said, "I decoyed her with a colored dish towel!" 

The April 11, 1983, strip showed Linus saying that he had given up his blanket and later going from door to door telling people how he gave up his blanket. Once, this resulted in the girl at the door angrily lashing him with her own blanket. Twice before Linus actually vowed to give up his blanket. Once he threw it away but grabbed it back, which is in another time, he was about to tell Charlie Brown about his new resolution when Charlie Brown ruined everything by tossing a blanket onto him. Trying again to give up the blanket, he left it on the side of the road and walked away, quickly running back to it because according to him, it was whimpering. In another effort to be rid of his habit, he has Snoopy hold on to it, who then made it into sport coats for both him and Woodstock. Just when he felt that he is over his blanket, Charlie Brown has him hooked again by giving him another one.

In one particularly angry confrontation over the issue, which is in the aforementioned blanket-for-smoking episode, Linus admitted that if his mother ordered him to stop, he would comply, but no one else, especially Lucy or the "blanket-hating" grandmother, would have that authority. In that confrontation, when Lucy decided that he had gone without the blanket for two weeks and that he no longer needed it, she threw it into the trash burner. Linus intervened at the last second and retrieved his blanket, reminding her that if their mother wanted him to give up the blanket he would have to do it, but until then it was nobody else's business. Never objecting, the mother was evidently content to let her unusually intelligent son grow out of the habit on his own. In later strips, Linus is shown with it less and less, and Schulz admitted in 1989 that Linus had finally outgrown the blanket, and it was only in the strip when required for the humor. In one comic, Linus suddenly stopped sucking his thumb and said "It's a good thumb, but not a great thumb." The special "Why, Charlie Brown, Why?", released the following year, is the only one in which Linus is never seen with his blanket, although nor is it even mentioned, arguably to make Linus appear more mature given the special's serious subject. Eventually, he is reunited with it.

Appearance 
Linus has brown hair and hazel eyes and normally wears a red striped shirt, black shorts, red socks, and dark brown tennis shoes. On February 5, 1962, Linus began wearing eyeglasses after being diagnosed with myopia, but after the Sunday strip of September 9, 1962, the glasses were not seen again. In an earlier strip of July 17, 1962, Linus had told Charlie Brown that his ophthalmologist said that he may not have to wear his glasses all the time, which is thus explaining their eventual disappearance.

Relationships

Lucy Van Pelt 

Linus is often bullied by his older sister, Lucy Van Pelt, to which he responds by either giving in or taking revenge.

Linus often defused and defeated Lucy's bullying through nonviolent or passive resistance and clever use of his intellect, either logically talking Lucy out of hitting him or confusing her into submission. Later in the strip, the pair got a younger brother, Rerun, who looked nearly identical to Linus, though smaller. Coincidentally, this occurred at the same time Lucy kicked Linus out of the house, leading her to cry in dismay, to which she said, "A 'new' baby brother? But I just got rid of the 'old' one!" She then let him back in stating, "You can't shovel water with a pitchfork!" The irony was not lost on Linus, who foolishly mocked her behavior until she gagged him with his own security blanket.

Charlie Brown 

Linus is Charlie Brown's best friend. Linus became sympathetic towards Charlie Brown and often gave him advice after listening to Charlie Brown's various insecurities. Similarly, Charlie Brown generally observed Linus's faults, such as his undying faith in the Great Pumpkin, his dependence on his security blanket, or any of his other odd quirks. They are also together in an allegiance over a common enemy, which included Lucy, who harassed and tormented Charlie Brown nearly as much as she does to Linus. The two boys are often seen having discussions while sitting on a street curb or leaning up against the brick wall. At some point in the strip, Linus began to appear sitting behind Charlie Brown in school, despite supposedly being a year younger.

Linus generally played second base on Charlie Brown's baseball team, but he has substituted as pitcher for Charlie Brown when the latter has been unable to pitch. On these occasions, Linus's skill has served to propel the team onto an uncharacteristic winning streak.

Crushes and admirers 

Upon the introduction of Charlie Brown's little sister, Sally Brown, in 1959, Linus had the desire to marry her. As the strip progressed, he outgrew this idea. Meanwhile, Sally proceeded to fall in love with Linus, calling him her "Sweet Babboo", much to his displeasure. Linus, in his turn, has an innocent unrequited love crush on his school teacher, Miss Othmar, who later marries and becomes Mrs. Hagemeyer. In some of the later 1990s strips, he developed an interest in the girl named Lydia, who sat behind him, and kept changing her name and, as Linus is two months older than her, asked him, "Aren't you kind of old for me?" It was also Linus who first introduced Frieda as "a sort of a friend of mine" who sat behind him in school. He also fell for several different girls in various animated television specials, including a girl called Truffles, whom he and Snoopy met while looking for the fungi bearing her name.

Voiced by 

 Christopher Shea (1965–1968)
 Glenn Gilger (1969)
 Stephen Shea (1971–1975)
 Liam Martin (1975–1977)
 Donavan Freberg (1977–1978)
 Daniel Anderson (1978–1980)
 Rocky Reilly (1980–1983)
 Jeremy Schoenberg (1983–1985)
 David T. Wagner (1984–1985)
 Jeremy Miller (1985–1988)
 Brandon Stewart (1988–1990)
 Josh Keaton (1991)
 John Christian Graas (1992–1993)
 Anthony Burch (1995–1997)
 Corey Padnos (2000–2003)
 Benjamin Bryan (2006)
 Quinn Lord (2008–2009)
 Tyler Kohanek (2009)
 Austin Lux (2011)
 Alexander Garfin (2015)
 Jude Perry (2016)
 Felix Helden (2018–2019)
 Wyatt White (2019–present)

References

External links

 The first appearance of Linus Van Pelt in the "Peanuts" comic strip from September 19, 1952.

Peanuts characters
Fictional baseball players
Fictional philosophers
Comics characters introduced in 1952
Child characters in animated films
Child characters in comics
Child characters in musical theatre
Child characters in television
Male characters in animation
Male characters in comics